The Francis Deane Cottage is an historic house located at 52 North Main Street, in Uxbridge, Massachusetts.  The  story wood-frame house was built c. 1845–55, most likely for its first occupant, a local lawyer named Francis Deane.  The house is a well preserved local instance of Greek Revival styling, with a pedimented gable that projects over a porch that is supported by Doric columns.  The main entry is framed by sidelight windows and panelled stiles, and is topped by a decorative panel.

On October 7, 1983, it was added to the National Register of Historic Places.

See also
National Register of Historic Places listings in Uxbridge, Massachusetts

References

External links
 Francis Deane Cottage MACRIS Listing

Houses in Uxbridge, Massachusetts
National Register of Historic Places in Uxbridge, Massachusetts
Houses on the National Register of Historic Places in Worcester County, Massachusetts